Dragmacidon lunaecharta, also known as the red ball sponge or red boring sponge, is a species of sea sponge found in the western Atlantic Ocean. It feeds on plankton. These sponges do not attach themselves to rocks or the sea floor but drift in water currents. Its main predators are seaslugs. It has been kept in home aquariums.

Taxonomy 
It was first described in 1886 by Stuart Oliver Ridley and Arthur Dendy  as Axinella lunaecharta, but in 1887, in their final report, they transferred it to the genus, Pseudaxinella. In 1917, E.F. Hallman revised some genera in the family, Axinellidae, and transferred it to the genus, Dragmacidon.

References

External links
 Plate XXXVII Axinella lunaecharta

Axinellidae
Taxa named by Arthur Dendy
Taxa named by Stuart Oliver Ridley